There are over 20,000 Grade II* listed buildings in England. This page is a list of these buildings in the district of Ryedale in North Yorkshire.

Ryedale

|}

Notes

External links

 
Lists of Grade II* listed buildings in North Yorkshire
Grade II*